A0620-00 (abbreviated from 1A 0620-00) is a binary star system in the constellation of Monoceros, with an apparent magnitude of 11.2

A0620-00 consists of two objects. The first object is a K-type main-sequence star. The two objects orbit each other every 7.75 hours.

A0620-00 has undergone two X-ray outbreaks. The first one was in 1917. The second burst, in 1975, was detected by the Ariel 5 satellite. During that time, A0620-00 was the brightest X-ray point source. It is now classified as an X-ray nova. Its black hole nature was determined in 1986.

The black hole in A0620-00 pulls matter from the K-type star into an accretion disk. The accretion disk emits significant amounts of visible light and X-rays. Because the K-type star has been pulled into an ellipsoidal shape, the amount of surface area visible, and thus the apparent brightness, changes from the Earth's perspective. A0620-00 also bears the variable star designation V616 Monocerotis.

Stephen Hawking memorial broadcast

On 15 June 2018, a signal was transmitted from the European Space Agency big radio antenna at Cebreros Station (77 kilometers west of Madrid, Spain), in memory of Stephen Hawking, who died on 14 March 2018, and his work on the physics of black holes. The broadcast will travel the 3,457-light-year distance at the speed of light and will arrive in the year 5475; this will be the first-ever human interaction with a currently known black hole. 1A 0620-00 was chosen for this broadcast as it was the closest known black hole to Earth at the time.
The message was one of peace and hope according to his family.

References

External links

X-ray binaries
Stellar black holes
K-type main-sequence stars
Monoceros (constellation)
Monocerotis, V616